Brichos is a 2007 Brazilian animated film directed by Paulo Munhoz.

The film portrays the Brazilian culture through national wildlife animals. The film gained a sequel titled Brichos – A Floresta é Nossa.

Plot
Tales, Jairzinho and Bandeira are crazy about video games and will come together to create a perfect fighter for the local video game championship. They went on a quest that will eventually revealing a secret in the forest where they live.

References

External links
 

2007 films
Brazilian animated films
Brazilian children's films
Films about video games
Animated films about animals
Flash animated films
Brazil in fiction